TT Cygni is a carbon star located  away in the northern constellation of Cygnus. It is classified as a semiregular variable of subtype SRb that ranges in brightness from magnitude 7.26 down to 8.0 with a period of 118 days. This object is called a carbon star because it has a high ratio of carbon to oxygen in its surface layers. The carbon was produced by helium fusion, dredged up from inside the star by deep convection triggered by a flash from the helium shell.

A thin spherical shell around the star, about half a light year across, was emitted 7,000 years ago. The dust is thought to be mostly amorphous carbon.

References 

Carbon stars
Semiregular variable stars
Asymptotic-giant-branch stars
Cygnus (constellation)
Durchmusterung objects
186047
096836
Cygni, TT